Spring Street Park is a public park in downtown Los Angeles, in the U.S. state of California.

Work on the $8 million park project began in 2011. Trees for the park arrived in 2013. The park has an off-leash dog area, as of 2014.

References

Downtown Los Angeles
Parks in Los Angeles